Cofaco is a Portuguese canned fish company, headquartered in Lisbon with industrial facilities in the Azores.

History
In 1961, Cofaco was created in the Algarve. Its head office was in Vila Real de Santo António. The tuna fish is rare in the Algarve.  Cofaco fishes in the Azores where the tuna passes and its migration routes begin. Currently, Cofaco is mainly located in the Azores and its industrial poles are concentrated in the islands of Pico, (Madalena do Pico), and S. Miguel (Rabo de Peixe). Its main brands include Bom Petisco, pitéu, líder, Ás do Mar, Bon Appetit, and Santamaria.

See also
Fishing in Portugal

External links
Official site

Food and drink companies of Portugal
Canned food
Companies based in Lisbon
Fishing in Portugal